The following is an episode list of The CW series, 90210 — a spin-off to Beverly Hills, 90210, and the fourth series in the Beverly Hills, 90210 franchise. The show premiered September 2, 2008 in the U.S. on The CW and in Canada on Global. 90210 is available for purchase in the United States on iTunes in both HD and SD quality.

Series overview

Episodes

Season 1 (2008-09)

Season 2 (2009–10)

Season 3 (2010–11)

Season 4 (2011–12)

Season 5 (2012–13)

Ratings

Specials
A retrospective of the entire series titled "90210 4ever" aired on May 13, 2013, before the series finale.

References

External links

Beverly Hills, 90210 (franchise)
Lists of American teen drama television series episodes